Yŏnsa County is a kun, or county, in North Hamgyŏng province, North Korea.  It was created following the division of Korea, being split off from Musan county in the 1952 reorganization of local government.

Geography
The land of Yŏnsa is high and mountainous, with even the low-lying areas more than 500 meters above sea level.  The county is traversed by the Hamgyŏng Mountains and the Paengmu Plateau.  Various streams flow through the county, including the Yŏnmyŏnsu (Chosŏn'gŭl: 연면수, Hancha: 延面水), Kuunsu (Chosŏn'gŭl: 구운수, Hancha: 九雲水), Sudongsu (Chosŏn'gŭl: 수동수), and Sŏdusu (Chosŏn'gŭl: 서두수, Hancha: 西頭水).  84% of the county is forested. The highest point is Kwanmobong (Chosŏn'gŭl: 관모봉, Hancha: 冠帽峰).

Administrative divisions
Yŏnsa County is divided into 1 ŭp (town), 1 rodongjagu (workers' districts) and 10 ri (villages):

Economy
Lumbering dominates the economy of Yŏnsa, and there are numerous lumbermills. Wild roots and fruits are also gathered from the mountains.

There is very little agriculture, due to the lack of arable land; the farming that is carried out is chiefly dry-field farming.  Yŏnsa is responsible for more than half of North Hamgyŏng's potato crop. Cultivated land makes up 4.3% of the county's area.

Transportation
Yŏnsa lies on the Paengmu Line of the Korean State Railway, and is also served by roads.

See also
Geography of North Korea
Administrative divisions of North Korea

External links

Counties of North Hamgyong